Zhao Xuxin (born January 15, 1999) is a Chinese professional basketball player, currently playing for Jiangsu Dragons of the Chinese Basketball Association (CBA).

Playing career 
Zhao played for youth team Vizura Shark (2016–17). In 2017, he joined Mladost Admiral of the Basketball League of Serbia. In 2018, he joined Beovuk 72 for the 2018–19 BLS season.

In 2019, he joined Jiangsu Dragons of the Chinese Basketball Association (CBA).

See also 
 List of foreign basketball players in Serbia

References

External links 
 Player Profile at eurobasket.com
 Player Profile at realgm.com

1999 births
Living people
Basketball League of Serbia players
Basketball players from Jiangsu
Chinese men's basketball players
Chinese expatriate basketball people
Jiangsu Dragons players
KK Beovuk 72 players
KK Mladost Zemun players
Small forwards
Expatriate basketball people in Serbia
Chinese expatriate sportspeople in Serbia